George Poland House is a historic home located near Bahama, Durham County, North Carolina.  It was designed by architect George Matsumoto and built in 1956 in the International Style.  It was originally located at 3929 Arrow Drive in Raleigh, North Carolina and moved to its present location in 2001. It is a rectangular, one-story, flat-roofed dwelling on a full basement. The house features cantilevered floor and ceiling beams, a front entry platform, a full-facade covered rear porch, and an open elevated wraparound walkway.

It was listed on the National Register of Historic Places in 2004.

References

Houses on the National Register of Historic Places in North Carolina
International style architecture in North Carolina
Houses completed in 1956
Houses in Durham County, North Carolina
National Register of Historic Places in Durham County, North Carolina